Saccharopolyspora spongiae is a bacterium from the genus Saccharopolyspora which has been isolated from the sponge Scopalina ruetzleri.

References

External links
Type strain of Saccharopolyspora spongiae at BacDive -  the Bacterial Diversity Metadatabase

Pseudonocardineae
Bacteria described in 2017